The Cliff Walk at Pourville is an 1882 painting by the French Impressionist painter Claude Monet. It currently resides at the Art Institute of Chicago. It is a landscape painting featuring two women atop a cliff above the sea. 

The canvas was inspired by an extended stay at Pourville in 1882. Monet settled in the village between February and mid-April, during which time he wrote to his future wife, Alice Hoschedé, "How beautiful the countryside is becoming, and what joy it would be for me to show you all its delightful nooks and crannies!" They returned in June of that year. The two young women standing atop the cliff may be Hoschedé's daughters, Marthe and Blanche; it has also been suggested that the figures represent Alice and Blanche, both of whom painted out of doors at that time. 

The various elements of the painting are unified through brushwork; short, crisp strokes were used to paint the grasses of the cliff, the women's drapery and the distant sea. A sense of movement suggested by painterly calligraphy was a property of Monet's work in the 1880s, and is here used to connote the effect of a summer wind upon figures, land, water, and clouds moving across the sky. During the painting process, Monet reduced the size of a rocky promontory at far right, to better balance the composition's proportions; however, it's also been noted that this secondary cliff was a late addition to the canvas, and was not part of the original design. An X-ray of the painting indicates that the artist originally painted a third figure into the grouping, then removed it.

Describing similar works by the artist, art historian John House wrote, “His cliff tops rarely show a single sweep of terrain. Instead there are breaks in space; the eye progresses into depth by a succession of jumps; distance is expressed by planes overlapping each other and by atmospheric rather than linear perspective- by softening the focus and changes of color.” The sense of immediacy is heightened by the juxtapositions of the cliff and sea, the contrast between ground and openness.

See also
List of paintings by Claude Monet

References

1882 paintings
Paintings by Claude Monet
Paintings in the collection of the Art Institute of Chicago
Ships in art